Luis Marquetti (August 24, 1901 - July 30, 1991) was a Cuban songwriter and composer. He was born in the town of Alquízar.

Among his well-known boleros are Allí donde tú sabes and Deuda.

Career 
Born Luis Marquetti Marquetti, he was one of the great composers of the bolero, along such contemporaries as Orlando de la Rosa, Pedro Junco, René Touzet, Isolina Carrillo, Osvaldo Farrés, Felo Bergaza, Adolfo Guzmán and Juan Bruno Tarraza.

Marquetti was the author of the hit song Deuda, popularized by a variety of musicians within and outside of Cuba.

He reached public notice through the voice of Pedro Vargas who contracted to record Deuda for RCA Víctor in New York.

Between 1946 and 1957 he had more than 30 of his works performed by over 100 artists. On the radio in Cuba his hits were performed by Sonora Matancera, Daniel Santos, Celia Cruz, Leo Marini, Bobby Capó, Celio González and Vicentico Valdés. In the 1950s, as recorded popular music gained an audience through the sale of 45 rpms, Marquetti's work spread throughout the island. In 1984 the recording firm Areíto (EGREM) put out a compilation of his previous recordings as Un Nuevo Corazón. His music was played on Cuban television, especially during the 1980s. His songs were used for film scores in Cuban and Mexican movies from the 1950s to the 1990s. His work also has appeared on the Cuban ballet.

In May 1952 Puerto Rican singer/composer Bobby Capó broke discriminatory policies imposed by CMQ, the most important network in the country at the time, which refused to promulgate Marquetti's work due to the color of his skin. When Capó included Marquetti's Deuda in recordings he was making in New York, a representative of the network brought up the problem, but Capó refused to exclude said bolero. The song was then included, but not officially listed. Further protest from Capó and others brought enough pressure to bear that Deuda was in the end properly included in the program.

In recent years Deuda has been recorded by Cheo Feliciano and, revising a version by Arsenio Rodriguez, was included in the Buena Vista Social Club album, sung by Ibrahim Ferrer.

Catalog 
 A ti, madrecita mía, 1941
 A ti que te pasa, 1956
 Allí donde tú sabes, 1948
 Alquízar, 1992
 Alma de azúcar, 1941
 Amor en Navidad, 1957
 Amor que malo eres, 1950
 Aquí entre nosotros, 1945
 Así te besaré, 1946
 Así no vengas, 1947
 Boletera, 1951
 Cada segundo te alejas más, 1992
 Caminito del abismo, 1954
 Cañaveral, 1950
 Con quien es, 1943
 Cualquiera se equivoca, 1950
 Cuba en mí, 1947
 Cuenta nueva, 1950
 De mis noches te reservo la mejor, 1992
 De ti la vida, 1943
 Debemos decidir, 1955
 Denúncieme señora, 1952
 Desastre, 1954
 Desde mi carreta, 1942
 Deuda, 1945
 El momento que vivimos, 1947
 En una frase, 1943
 Enséñame a deletrear, 1941
 Entre espumas, 1946
 Esta noche a las diez, 1943
 Este anochecer, 1966
 Este desengaño, 1947
 Fue realidad, 1949
 Hoy que la luna te regala su presencia, 1981
 Iba a suceder, 1947
 Iguales, 1946
 La quinta parte, 1947
 La verdad de mi canción, 1992
 Las Américas Unidas, 1941
 Las cosas de mi tierra, 1942
 Llegaste primavera, 1967
 Llevarás la marca, 1947
 Lo que eres tú, 1942
 Me robaste la vida, 1947
 Mi negrona, 1941
 Mírame de frente, 1956
 No es mucho, 1964
 No me avergüenza, 1954
 No me culpes, 1948
 No te vayas, 1941
 Nuestro problema, 1956
 Pacté con Dios, 1953
 Plazos Traicioneros, 1953
 Porfiado corazón, 1951
 Precaución, 1948
 Promesas de un campesino, 1946
 Rectifiquemos, 1955
 Robaré tu propio corazón, 1992
 Sabor de conga, 1941
 Si te lo digo, 1941
 Sigue tu canto, 1941
 Son de maíz, 1941

References
Luis Marquetti: Gigante del Bolero. 2ª Edición del Author Luis César Núñez.
Por las calles de su pueblo, El Habanero, 2000
Luis Marquetti Marquetti

1901 births
1991 deaths
Cuban songwriters
Male songwriters
People from Artemisa Province
20th-century male musicians